The 1910 North East Cork by-election was held on 2 March 1910.  The by-election was held due to the incumbent All-for-Ireland MP, William O'Brien, being elected to sit for Cork City.  It was won by the All-for-Ireland candidate Maurice Healy, who was unopposed.

References

1910 elections in Ireland
1910 elections in the United Kingdom
By-elections to the Parliament of the United Kingdom in County Cork constituencies
Unopposed by-elections to the Parliament of the United Kingdom (need citation)